The Hitchcock House is a house at 5704 W. Ohio Street in the Austin neighborhood of Chicago, Illinois, United States. It was designated a Chicago Landmark on July 7, 1992.

References

Houses completed in 1871
Houses in Chicago
Chicago Landmarks